The EU NanoSafety Cluster (NSC) is a cluster of European Commission-funded projects in the funding programs FP6 (2002–2006), FP7 (2007–2013), and Horizon 2020 aka H2020 (2014–2020) framework programmes, aimed at harmonizing the research done in these projects. The cluster coordinates work done by the NanoSafety Cluster projects to study and establish the safety of nanomaterials. The coordination by the cluster is organized in half-yearly meetings and various working groups. An example of a result of the NanoSafety Cluster's harmonization was the prioritization of which nanomaterials to study. The NSC has become a reference actor for consumers' associations in the field.

History 
The NanoSafety Cluster followed in part from the NanoImpactNet project that ran from 2004 to 2012.

The NSC started in 2006 with FP6-funded projects such as CellNanoTox, DIPNA, NanoInteract, NANOTRANSPORT, and NANOSH. This was followed by more than 50 projects in FP7. There are currently four H2020 projects.

The budget for the project is  million.

Structure 
The EU NanoSafety Cluster has nine working groups, each with different objectives and goals. WG2 (Hazard Identification) has four focus groups relating to immunosafety, marine ecotox, genotoxicity, and reprotoxicology. WG7 (Dissemination) has a sub-group dedicated to standardization and publishes the NanoSafety Cluster Newsletter. WG9 (Safe by Design and Industrial Innovation) has a sub-group called Industrial Innovation Liaison (i2L), that functions as a cross-linking working group to maximize various pilot-and innovation-led segments of the project.

 Materials (WG1)
 Hazard (WG2)
 Exposure (WG3)
 Database (WG4)
 Risk (WG5)
 Modelling (WG6)
 Dissemination (WG7)
 Systems Biology (WG8)
 Safe by Design and Industrial Innovation (WG9)

Results 
The European Chemicals Agency updated their European Union Observatory for Nanomaterials (EUON) in 2018 with results from the Cluster, including use of software
developed by the eNanoMapper project and data collected in projects like MARINA, NANoREG, and eNanoMapper.

See also 
 Framework Programmes for Research and Technological Development

References

Further reading

External links 

 
 

FP6 projects
European Union and science and technology
FP7 projects
Horizon 2020 projects